Chamaesphecia albiventris is a moth of the family Sesiidae. It is found in Bulgaria, Greece and Asia Minor.

The larvae feed on Melissa officinalis.

References

Moths described in 1853
Sesiidae
Moths of Europe
Moths of Asia